Andrei Kuteikin (born September 30, 1984) is a Russian professional ice hockey defenceman who is currently an unrestricted free agent. He most recently played for HC Spartak Moscow of the Kontinental Hockey League (KHL).

Kuteikin made his Kontinental Hockey League debut playing with Salavat Yulaev Ufa during the inaugural 2008–09 KHL season.

References

External links

1984 births
Living people
Avangard Omsk players
HC Dynamo Moscow players
Salavat Yulaev Ufa players
SKA Saint Petersburg players
HC Spartak Moscow players
Russian ice hockey defencemen